Lithophila is a genus of plants in the family Amaranthaceae.  Some species are endemic to Ecuador.

Species
, Plants of the World Online accepted two species:
Lithophila muscoides Sw. – Caribbean to northern South America
 Lithophila radicata (Hook.f.) Standl. – the Galápagos Islands

References

 
Amaranthaceae genera
Taxonomy articles created by Polbot
Taxa named by Olof Swartz